Erim Metto, a child of migrants, (born: 25 July 1966; Erim Hassan) is a Turkish-British film director, producer, screenwriter, and business executive. He is the director of the RAaW (film and theatre training company) and CEO of the Turkish Cypriot Community Association. He is the first Turkish Speaking magistrate  in the United Kingdom. He was the editor of the book Departures and Arrivals written by Hatice Abdullah. He was a torch bearer for the 2012 London Olympics.

Metto was the recipient of the first Turkish Cypriot Community Achiever Award (Male).

Early Years
Metto studies at Greenwich University, following graduation, he started to work for the London Borough of Haringey, and within a year, took the role of Race Equality Officer within the Tottenham constituency, which incorporates Broadwater Farm. He became the first Turkish Speaking Justice of the Peace in 1996, he was a founding member of Enfield Turkish Cypriot Association and has worked with many Turkish organisations over the years raising in excess of £4million pounds for Turkish oriented projects in the UK, Cyprus and Turkey. In 2012 was nominated by various groups in London, ran with The Olympic Torch.

After a hiatus of eight years, Metto assumed the role of CEO at TCCA and has worked on several major projects including the establishment of the Turkish Cypriot Cultural and Arts Festival, The Turkish Cypriot Awards and launch of the Turkish Cypriot Trust UK. Metto spearheaded TCCA to receive a Cache beacon status and a bronze award from the Charity Awards Scheme in 2015. He also led several major international events and was responsible for carrying out the largest study into access of health care within the Turkish and Kurdish communities. Within the field of Project development Metto has developed projects from London to India, including the establishment of an elders' facility in Lefke. Under Metto's leadership, TCCA won the CENTUS top organisation within its first year. In 2019 Metto was awarded Community Achiever of the year at the inaugural Turkish Cypriot Community Awards.

Career

Films
Metto is a director and producer. He directed or produced five feature-length films, six documentaries, and 21 shorts.

Other works 
In 2012, together with his partner, Robbi Stevens, Metto launched RAaW Ltd. He is also CEO of Turkish Cypriot Community Association.

In 2020, Metto launched the Turkish Cypriot COVID-19 Initiative, a partnership of six organisations that has led in the delivery of services to the most vulnerable within the community, the initiative impacted on the lives of the vulnerable. His work has been commended by receiving the Haringey Hero Award and the recipient of the Bridge Renewal Trust Impact award, for funded contribution towards supporting those vulnerable within our community.

Personal life
Metto is married to filmmaker Robbi Stevens and has two daughters.

References

External links
 

British filmmakers
Living people
English people of Turkish Cypriot descent
British people of Turkish Cypriot descent
1966 births